The 1980 World Champions' Gold Cup (Spanish for "Copa de Oro de Campeones Mundiales"), also known as Mundialito ("Little World Cup"), was a friendly international football tournament organized by the Uruguayan Football Association and supported by FIFA–although not officially recognized–in commemoration of the 50th anniversary of the first FIFA World Cup, which had been celebrated in 1930 at the same venue. It was held at the Centenario Stadium in Montevideo, Uruguay, from 30 December 1980 to 10 January 1981.

The tournament gathered the national teams of Uruguay, Italy, West Germany, Brazil, Netherlands, and Argentina, the six World Cup-winning nations at the time, with the addition of the Netherlands –1974 and 1978 World Cup runners-up– who had been invited to replace England, who declined the invitation due to an already crowded fixture list. The World Champions' Gold Cup was held in the middle of the European football season (December/January) and the English league (as well as its clubs) were reluctant to release their players for a long journey to another continent.

Participating teams

Format

The six teams were distributed in two groups of three: Group A was composed of the Netherlands, Italy, and Uruguay; Group B consisted of Argentina, Brazil, and West Germany. The winners of each group faced each other to decide the tournament winner.

Squads

Each team had a squad of 18 players (two of which had to be goalkeepers).

Outcome
Uruguay and Brazil won their respective groups and played the final, with Uruguay defeating Brazil 2–1 with a late goal, the same result that had occurred 30 years earlier between the two teams in the deciding match of the 1950 World Cup. Uruguay's coach during the Mundialito, Roque Máspoli, had also been Uruguay's goalkeeper in the 1950 match.

Dutch manager Jan Zwartkruis resigned from his position as soon as he returned to the Netherlands, while Leopoldo Luque and Rainer Bonhof never represented their country again.

Group stage

Group A

Group B

Final

Scorers

3 goals
 Waldemar Victorino

1 goal

 Ramón Díaz
 Diego Maradona
 Edevaldo
 Junior
 Serginho
 Sócrates
 Toninho Cerezo
 Zé Sérgio
 Klaus Allofs
 Horst Hrubesch
 Jan Peters
 Carlo Ancelotti
 Jorge Barrios
 Julio Morales
 Venancio Ramos

Own goals
 Manfred Kaltz (against Argentina)

See also
FIFA Confederations Cup
FIFA World Cup

References

1980 Mundialito
m
m
m
m
m
m
m
m
m
m
m
m
m
m
m
m
m